Alamosa County is a county located in the U.S. state of Colorado. As of the 2020 census, the population was 16,376. The county seat is Alamosa. The county name is the Spanish language word for a "grove of cottonwood trees."

History
Alamosa County was created by the Colorado legislature on March 8, 1913, out of northwestern Costilla County.

Geography

Adjacent counties
Saguache County, Colorado - north
Huerfano County, Colorado - east
Costilla County, Colorado - southeast
Conejos County, Colorado - southwest
Rio Grande County, Colorado - west

Major Highways
  U.S. Highway 160
  U.S. Highway 285
  State Highway 17
  State Highway 150
  State Highway 368
  State Highway 370
  State Highway 371

National protected area
Great Sand Dunes National Park and Preserve

Other protected areas
Alamosa National Wildlife Refuge
Great Sand Dunes Wilderness
Monte Vista National Wildlife Refuge
Rio Grande National Forest
San Luis Lakes State Wildlife Area
Sangre de Cristo Wilderness

Scenic trails
Los Caminos Antiguos Scenic and Historic Byway
Old Spanish National Historic Trail

Transportation
Alamosa is served by San Luis Valley Regional Airport. The only commercial service is to Denver.

Demographics

At the 2000 census there were 14,966 people, 5,467 households, and 3,651 families living in the county. The racial makeup of the county was 71.19% White, 0.97% Black or African American, 2.34% Native American, 0.82% Asian, 0.19% Pacific Islander, 20.34% from other races, and 4.16% from two or more races. 41.41% of the population were Hispanic or Latino of any race.
Of the 5,467 households 35.30% had children under the age of 18 living with them, 50.50% were married couples living together, 11.70% had a female householder with no husband present, and 33.20% were non-families. 27.30% of households were one person and 8.70% were one person aged 65 or older. The average household size was 2.56 and the average family size was 3.14.

The age distribution was 27.20% under the age of 18, 15.90% from 18 to 24, 26.70% from 25 to 44, 20.60% from 45 to 64, and 9.60% 65 or older. The median age was 31 years. For every 100 females there were 99.00 males. For every 100 females age 18 and over, there were 95.30 males.

The median household income was $29,447 and the median family income was $38,389. Males had a median income of $27,733 versus $22,806 for females. The per capita income for the county was $15,037. About 15.60% of families and 21.30% of the population were below the poverty line, including 27.40% of those under age 18 and 13.90% of those age 65 or over.

In 2000, the largest denominational groups were Catholics (with 5,716 members) and Evangelical Protestants (with 1,755 members). The largest religious bodies were the Catholic Church (with 5,716 adherents) and the Church of Jesus Christ of Latter-day Saints (with 1,155 adherents).

Politics

Alamosa County is a competitive swing county, voting for the winning Presidential candidate in every election since its formation except 1944, 1960, 1976, 2016, and 2020. In the 2016 election, Donald Trump – who captured several previously solidly Democratic counties in southern Colorado – became the first Republican to win the presidency without carrying the county since it was created before the 1916 election. Trump flipped the county in 2020, the only one in Colorado, and one of only fifteen nationally, which he turned from blue to red that year.

Sheriff's Office

The Alamosa County Sheriff's Office is a local police agency in Alamosa County, Colorado, United States. It consists of 18 sworn law enforcement officers and 21 civilian support personnel.

Rank structure

Communities

City
Alamosa

Town
Hooper

Census Designated Place
 Alamosa East

Unincorporated communities
 Estrella
 Hartner
 Henry
 La Fruto
 Mosca
 Waverly

License plate code
Alamosa County has used the following county codes on Colorado license plates issued to passenger vehicles in the county: XE-XG and EAA-ABD.

See also

Outline of Colorado
Index of Colorado-related articles
Colorado census statistical areas
Colorado counties
List of law enforcement agencies in Colorado
National Register of Historic Places listings in Alamosa County, Colorado

Notes

References

External links

Colorado County Evolution by Don Stanwyck
Colorado Historical Society
Official page at Facebook

 

 
1913 establishments in Colorado
Populated places established in 1913
Colorado counties
San Luis Valley of Colorado